= 1898 in basketball =

The following are the basketball events of the year 1898 throughout the world.

== Events ==
- April 23 – The 23rd Street YMCA of New York City wins the first national basketball championship tournament, organized by the U.S. Amateur Athletic Union (AAU).
